This article covers the 2015 football season in Chile.

National tournaments

Primera División

Clausura Champion: Cobresal
Topscorer: Esteban Paredes & Jean Paul Pineda
Apetura Champion: Colo-Colo
Topscorer: Marcos Riquelme

Copa Chile

Champion: Universidad de Concepción
Topscorer: Carlos González Espínola

Champion: Club Universidad de Chile
Topscorer: Esteban Paredes & Felipe Mora & Juan Muriel Orlando

National team results

The Chile national football team results and fixtures for 2015.

2015

Record

Goal scorers

References

External links
The official Chilean Football Association web site

Seasons in Chilean football